Stevo Stepanovski (born 17 July 1950) is a Macedonian bibliophile and owner of the largest private library in North Macedonia situated in Babino, Demir Hisar. Ramkovski Foundation in September 2010 granted him the “Krste Petkov Misirkov” Work-Life Award.

References

External links 
 “Nagradata 'Krste Petkov Misirkov' za zivotno delo na Stevo Stepanovski”
 “Sveceno otkriena plocata so logoto na Fondacijata 'Ramkovski'”

1950 births
Living people
People from Demir Hisar Municipality
Bibliophiles